Kevin McGahern (born 7 November 1986) is an Irish comedian, TV presenter, writer and actor. He is the former host of Republic of Telly between 2013 and 2017 and documentary series Kevin McGahern's America.

Early life 
McGahern was born in 1986 and grew up on a farm in Gowna, County Cavan. McGahern graduated from the University of Wolverhampton in 2009 with a degree in Animation. He became a stand-up comedian after working as a barman in the birthplace of Irish stand-up comedy, the International Bar. He stated in an interview that the two biggest influences on his early stand up were Steve Martin and Dylan Moran.

Career 
In 2011, McGahern starred in the independent feature film No Party for Billy Burns which was written and directed by Padraig Conaty. The film also stars Shane Connaughton, Sonya O'Donoghue and Charlie McGuinness. In 2013, McGahern became the host of Republic of Telly replacing Dermot Whelan. He continued to host the show until its eventual cancellation in 2017, and was the longest serving host of the show.

In 2017, McGahern hosted his own documentary series Kevin McGahern's America in which he explored various aspects of life in America: gun rights, intimacy in the digital age, and whether you really can choose your family. It received positive reviews and McGahern was praised for his "low-key yet alert" interviewing style. In 2021, McGahern hosted the RTÉ comedy panel show Clear History alongside team captains, Joanne McNally and Colin Murphy. The series returned in 2022 with McGahern and McNally joined by new captain Jason Byrne.

Other work 
Outside of his career in stand-up and presenting, McGahern is known for his acting work. Chris Tordoff, creator of Hardy Bucks, spotted McGahern during a stand-up performance one night in Dublin and offered him a cameo on his new show. McGahern's character, 'Sim Card', quickly became a regular cast member. In 2014, McGahern wrote and directed The Devil's Ceili with Philip Doherty, which went on to win two awards including best play at the All Ireland Drama Festival. The play presents the psychedelic experiences of three social climbers in a small Cavan town who are slipped LSD by the devil. McGahern has also had acting roles in many Irish comedy series including, Bridget & Eamon, The Doireann Project, Nowhere Fast and Finding Joy. Between 2021 and 2022, McGahern had a recurring role as 'Michael Foley' in the RTÉ drama series, Smother. In 2021, McGahern had a two-episode guest role on the CBBC musical science-fiction series, Nova Jones.

Activism 
McGahern often uses satire for activism. The Republic of Telly sketch "Felix Bollard: A Serious Man" lampooned anti-LGBT rights campaigners' activities during the run-up to the marriage equality referendum of 2015 in Ireland. Along with fellow Irish comedian Tara Flynn, he wrote and starred in a video for LGBT Noise called "Armagaydon". The video had a swell of international support. As well as speaking out in favour of marriage equality, McGahern has also campaigned in favour of a "yes" vote in the 2018 abortion referendum.

Personal life 
McGahern married Siobhan Cassidy in 2018. They have two children together.

References 

1986 births
Living people
Irish male comedians
Irish male actors
Irish male writers
Irish television presenters
Irish LGBT rights activists
People from County Cavan
21st-century Irish comedians
Irish sketch comedians